R K Bharathi Mohan (12/06/67) is an Indian politician and Member of Parliament elected from Tamil Nadu. He is elected to the Lok Sabha from Mayiladuturai constituency as an Anna Dravida Munnetra Kazhagam candidate in 2014 election.

He was member of Tamil Nadu Assembly from Thiruvidamarudur (State Assembly Constituency) during 2006–2011.

References 

http://www.prsindia.org/mptrack/rkbharathimohan

All India Anna Dravida Munnetra Kazhagam politicians
Living people
India MPs 2014–2019
Lok Sabha members from Tamil Nadu
1951 births
People from Mayiladuthurai district
Tamil Nadu MLAs 2006–2011